Edoardo Tassi (born 10 June 1998) is an Italian footballer who plays as a forward.

Club career

Ascoli
After stints at the junior teams of Virtus Lanciano and Torino, he joined Ascoli in the summer of 2016 and played for their Under-19 team in the 2016–17 and 2017–18 seasons. He made spot appearances on the bench for the senior squad in 2016–17 and 2017–18 Serie B seasons, but did not see any field time. He made his debut for the senior squad on 4 August 2018 in a Coppa Italia 0–4 home loss against Viterbese as a 66th-minute substitute for Simone Andrea Ganz.

Loan to Reggina
On 30 August 2018, he joined Serie C club Reggina on a season-long loan. He made his Serie C debut for Reggina on 18 September 2018 in a game against Trapani as a 58th-minute substitute for Mattia Bonetto.

Loan to Fano
On 14 August 2019, he joined Fano in the Serie C on a season-long loan.

Viterbese
On 1 February 2021 he moved to Viterbese. On 28 January 2022, his contract with Viterbese was terminated by mutual consent.

Fermana
On 31 January 2022, Tassi signed with Fermana as a free agent.

References

External links
 

1998 births
Living people
People from Ascoli Piceno
Sportspeople from the Province of Ascoli Piceno
Italian footballers
Association football forwards
Serie C players
Ascoli Calcio 1898 F.C. players
Reggina 1914 players
Alma Juventus Fano 1906 players
U.S. Viterbese 1908 players
Fermana F.C. players
Footballers from Marche